Men of Yesterday is a 1936 British drama film directed by John Baxter and starring Stewart Rome, Sam Livesey and Hay Petrie. It was made at Shepperton Studios with sets designed by John Bryan. The screenplay concerns an ex-army officer who organises a gathering of his former comrades while at the same time confronting a personal crisis.

Cast
 Stewart Rome as Major Radford 
 Sam Livesey
 Hay Petrie
 Eve Lister 
 Cecil Parker 
 Roddy Hughes 
 Ian Colin 
 George Robey
 Will Fyffe 
 Ella Shields 
 Dick Henderson 
 Edgar Norfolk 
 Dick Francis 
 Edgar Driver 
 Frederick Culley 
 Freddie Watts 
 Patric Curwen 
 Stanley Kirby 
 Vi Kaley 
 Ernest Jay 
 John Hepworth 
 Henry Hepworth 
 J. Neil More 
 Gustave Ferrari 
 Denis Hayden 
 Terry Doyle 
 Barbara Everest

References

Bibliography
 Shaefer, Stephen. British Popular Films 1929-1939: The Cinema of Reassurance. Routledge, 2003. 
Wood, Linda. British Films, 1927–1939. British Film Institute, 1986.

External links
 

1936 films
1936 drama films
1930s English-language films
British drama films
Films set in England
Films shot at Shepperton Studios
Films directed by John Baxter
British black-and-white films
1930s British films